Sucrose:1,6-, 1,3-α-D-glucan 3-α- and 6-α-D-glucosyltransferase may refer to:-
 Sucrose—1,6-alpha-glucan 3(6)-alpha-glucosyltransferase, an enzyme
 Alternansucrase, an enzyme